Cuneiform TI or TÌL (Borger 2003 nr. ; U+122FE 𒋾) has the main meaning of "life" when used ideographically. The written sign developed from the drawing of an arrow, since the words meaning "arrow" and "life" were pronounced similarly in the Sumerian language.

With the determinative UZU 𒍜 "flesh, meat", UZUTI, it means "rib". This homophony is exploited in the myth of Ninti (𒊩𒌆𒋾 NIN.TI "lady of life" or "lady of the rib"), created by Ninhursag to cure the ailing Enki. Since Eve is called "mother of life" in Genesis, together with her being taken from Adam's  tsela` "side, rib", the story of Adam and Eve has sometimes been considered to derive from that of Ninti.

In Akkadian orthography, the sign has the syllabic values di or ṭi, in Hittite ti, di or te.

Amarna letters and Epic of Gilgamesh usage
The twelve tablet (I-XII) Epic of Gilgamesh uses the ti sign as follows (Parpola): ti (387 times), and TI (the Sumerogram), (2 times). In the Epic, Sumerogram TI is used for the Akkadian language word "balāṭu", for "life; to live", as "TI.LA", in one location, Tablet XI 174, (and replacement in two locations, also as TI.LA in Tablets X, and XI).

For the mid 14th century BC Amarna letters, letter EA 365 authored by Biridiya, harvesting in URUNuribta, ti is used for "ti", and "ṭi". For example, on the reverse of EA 365, subject of corvee labor, harvesting, lines 17 and 18 translate as follows:

(other city-governors): "(17) who, are with me (18) are not 'performing' (doing) (19) as I. They are not (20) harvesting..."

(the city rulers): "(17) ša it-ti-ia (18) la-a(=NOT) ti-pu-šu-na..."

References

 Parpola, 1971. The Standard Babylonian Epic of Gilgamesh, Parpola, Simo, Neo-Assyrian Text Corpus Project, c 1997, Tablet I thru Tablet XII, Index of Names, Sign List, and Glossary-(pp. 119–145), 165 pages.
Rainey, 1970. El Amarna Tablets, 359-379, Anson F. Rainey, (AOAT 8, Alter Orient Altes Testament 8, Kevelaer and Neukirchen -Vluyen), 1970, 107 pages.

Sumerian words and phrases
Cuneiform signs